Buildings at 10, 12, 14, and 16 East Chase Street is a historic set of rowhouses located at Baltimore,  Maryland, United States. Number 10 is a -story brick townhouse with a 3-bay front façade, fitted with marble facing from ground to first floor level.  It is believed to have been designed by Bruce Price and / or E. Francis Baldwin, architects of neighboring Christ Church.  Numbers 12, 14, and 16, by contrast, are identical -story, two-bay houses constructed of green serpentine marble with contrasting stone detail.  The group dates from between 1870 and 1875.  They represent a fine example of the Gothic Revival style as interpreted for domestic architecture.

The Buildings at 10, 12, 14, and 16 East Chase Street were listed on the National Register of Historic Places in 1980.

References

External links
, including photo from 1987, at Maryland Historical Trust

Houses on the National Register of Historic Places in Baltimore
Houses in Baltimore
Gothic Revival architecture in Maryland
Houses completed in 1875
Midtown, Baltimore
Bruce Price buildings